The British Rail Class 29 were a class of 20 diesel-electric Bo-Bo locomotives produced by the re-engining of the NBL Type 2 units. The units were designed for both passenger and freight trains.

Background
The machines were produced from 1963 onwards from the North British Type 2 (later Class 21 under TOPS) by replacing the original unreliable licence-built MAN engines of the Class 21s with Paxman Ventura V12 engines at Paxman's Colchester works.

The first unit to be re-engined was D6123, a further 19 machines were re-engined in 1965–1967 at Glasgow Works and mostly Inverurie Works, along with other modifications including the fitting of four-character headcode displays in the nose ends (D6123 retained its original front ends and so did not receive a headcode panel). After rebuilding, they returned to service from Eastfield depot in Glasgow. The allocation of all twenty locomotives in August 1967 was Eastfield.

Withdrawal
Although these offered more power and much improved reliability over the original Class 21s, they did not survive much longer, due to their small class size and the use of a non-standard high-speed diesel engine. D6108 was withdrawn in May 1969 and scrapped by McWilliams of Shettleston in 1971, while the other 19 were withdrawn between April and December 1971 and scrapped at BR's Glasgow Works in 1971–72. No Class 21, 22 or Class 29 locomotives survive today.

Numbering 
The rebuilt locomotives were numbered:

 D6100
 D6101
 D6102
 D6103
 D6106
 D6107
 D6108
 D6112
 D6113
 D6114
 D6116
 D6119
 D6121
 D6123
 D6124
 D6129
 D6130
 D6132
 D6133
 D6137

Model railways 
In 1978 Hornby Railways launched its first version of the BR Class 29 in BR green and blue liveries in OO gauge.
Dapol have more recently produced a Class 29 in multiple liveries.

References

Sources 
 
 
 
 Ian Allan ABC of British Railways Locomotives, summer 1966 edition

Further reading

External links 

 Paxman Ventura engine - at Richard Carr's Paxman History pages

28
Bo-Bo locomotives
NBL locomotives
Railway locomotives introduced in 1963
Standard gauge locomotives of Great Britain
Diesel-electric locomotives of Great Britain
Scrapped locomotives
Rebuilt locomotives